Parliamentary elections were held in Nigeria in August 1983. The Senate was elected on 20 August and the House of Representatives on 27 August. The result was a victory for the ruling National Party of Nigeria, which won 60 of the 96 Senate seats and 306 of the 450 House seats.

Results

Senate

House of Representatives

References

Nigeria
Nigeria
Parliamentary elections in Nigeria
Election and referendum articles with incomplete results